Major General Sir Richard Bannatine-Allason  (22 September 1855  – 1940) was a senior British Army officer.

Military career
Bannatine-Allason was born Richard Allason Bannatine. Educated at Wellington College, he was commissioned into the Royal Artillery in January 1875 and saw action in the Second Anglo-Afghan War in 1879. After changing his name to Richard Bannatyne-Allason in 1885, he saw action again in the Second Boer War before becoming a military attaché serving with Japanese forces during the Russo-Japanese War. He became commander of the Nowshera Brigade in India in April 1910 and General Officer Commanding 51st (Highland) Division in August 1914 at the start of the First World War. He landed in France with his division in May 1915 and saw action at the Battle of Festubert on the Western Front later that month before handing over command in September 1915. He returned to the UK and commanded the 61st (2nd South Midland) Division until February 1916; he later also commanded the 64th (2nd Highland) Division also in the UK before retiring in September 1918.

He was appointed a Companion of the Order of St Michael and St George on 1 January 1919 and a Knight Commander of the Order of the Bath on 1 January 1926.

References

|-

|-

1855 births
1940 deaths
Royal Artillery officers
Knights Commander of the Order of the Bath
Companions of the Order of St Michael and St George
People educated at Wellington College, Berkshire
British Army generals of World War I
British military personnel of the Second Anglo-Afghan War
British military attachés
British Army personnel of the Second Boer War
British Army major generals
People of the Russo-Japanese War